Make It Better may refer to:
 Make It Better, 2000 album by Dubstar
 "Make It Better (Forget About Me)", 1983 song by Tom Petty and the Heartbreakers
 "Make It Better", song by Mitsu-O! from Dance Dance Revolution